2014 2. deild was the 39th season of the third-tier football on the Faroe Islands.

League table

Results

Top goalscorers

See also
2014 Faroe Islands Premier League
2014 Faroe Islands Cup
2014 1. deild

References

2. deild
3
Faroe
Faroe

pl:2. deild Wysp Owczych (2014)